Peltoschema nigroconspersa is a species of beetle  in the leaf beetle family (Chrysomelidae). It was first described in 1865 as Paropsis nigroconspersa by Hamlet Clark.

References

Taxa described in 1865
Taxa named by Hamlet Clark
Chrysomelinae